Jack Veal (born 12 June 2007) is an English actor known for his role as Kid Loki in Loki (2021).

Early life 
Jack Veal was born on 12 June 2007, in London, England.

Career
In 2017, Veal appeared in the Amazon Prime Video series Tin Star and the Netflix series The End of the F***ing World, as Simon Brown and a young James, respectively. He starred in his first feature film My Name Is Lenny (2017), as a young Lenny. In 2018, he appeared in the BBC series Call the Midwife and the comedy film The Favourite, as Kevin Lunt and Boy, respectively. In 2019, he appeared in the crime film The Corrupted, as a young Liam. In 2020, he appeared in the fantasy film Come Away, as Curly. After appearing in several television shows and films, Veal gained fame when he was cast as Kid Loki in the 2021 streaming series Loki.

Filmography

Film

Television

References

External links
 

2007 births
Living people
English male film actors
English male television actors
English male child actors
Male actors from London